Papyrus 103 (in the Gregory-Aland numbering), designated by 𝔓103, is a copy of part of the New Testament in Greek. It is a papyrus manuscript of the Gospel of Matthew.

Description 
The surviving texts of Matthew are verses 13:55-56 and 14:3-5: they are in a fragmentary condition. The manuscript has been assigned palaeographically to the late 2nd or early 3rd century. 

Probably together with Papyrus 77 it belonged to the same codex. 

 Text
The Greek text of the codex is a representative of the Alexandrian text-type. According to Comfort it is proto-Alexandrian text.

In Matthew 13:55, the name of Jesus' second brother reads [...]ης so that either Ἰωάννης (John) and Ἰωσῆς (Joses) are possible original readings.
 Ἰωάννης (John) א* D M U Γ 2 28 579 1424 Byzmss vgmss Origenpt
 Ἰωσῆς (Joses) K L W Δ Π 0106 f13 22 565 1241 1582mg Byzmss itk,qc cosa,bomss Basil of Caesarea
 Ἰωσῆ (Joses) 118 157 700* 1071 syrh cobomss
 Ἰωσὴφ (Joseph) א2 B C N Θ f1 33 700c 892 lat syrs,c,hmg mae-1 Codex Schøyen cobomss Origenpt

 Location
The manuscript is currently housed at the Sackler Library (Papyrology Rooms, P. Oxy. 4403) in Oxford.

See also 

 List of New Testament papyri
 Oxyrhynchus Papyri

References

Further reading 
 J. David Thomas, The Oxyrhynchus Papyri LXIV (London: 1997), pp. 5–7.

External links

Images 
 P.Oxy.LXIV 4403 from Papyrology at Oxford's "POxy: Oxyrhynchus Online"
 𝔓103 recto and verso

Official registration 
 "Continuation of the Manuscript List" Institute for New Testament Textual Research, University of Münster. Retrieved April 9, 2008

New Testament papyri
3rd-century biblical manuscripts
Early Greek manuscripts of the New Testament
Gospel of Matthew papyri